Thomas FitzThomas FitzGerald, 3rd Baron of Desmond (c. 1290 - 1307), succeeded to the barony of Desmond, which lay in Munster, in the south of Ireland, in 1296, at the age of six, upon the death of his father, Thomas FitzGerald, 2nd Baron Desmond.  Thomas died young while still unmarried and childless, and was succeeded by his brother, Maurice FitzThomas FitzGerald.

Notes

Barons in the Peerage of Ireland
Thomas
13th-century Irish people
14th-century Irish people
1290 births
1307 deaths
Normans in Ireland